Theodore Edward le Bouthillier Allbeury (24 October 1917 – 4 December 2005) was a British author of espionage fiction. He served as an intelligence officer in the Special Operations Executive between 1940 and 1947, reaching the rank of lieutenant colonel. He is believed to be the only British secret agent who parachuted into Nazi Germany during the war, and he remained there until the Allied armies arrived. During the Cold War he was captured and tortured when running agents across the border between East and West Germany. After running his own advertising agency, he became the managing director of the seafort-based pirate radio station Radio 390 in 1964, later moving to the ship-based Radio 355 (see under Swinging Radio England for details) until its closure in August 1967.

His first novel, A Choice of Enemies, was published in 1972. Allbeury went on to publish over 40 novels, under his own name as well as Patrick Kelly and Richard Butler.

Early life
Allbeury was born in Stockport, Cheshire, and educated at King Edward VI Aston School, Birmingham.

Media adaptations
Allbeury's 1984 novel No Place to Hide was filmed as Hostage (1992) and starred Sam Neill, Talisa Soto and James Fox. The 1992 film Blue Ice starring Michael Caine is "based" on Allbeury characters.

BBC Radio 4 broadcast adaptions of The Other Side Of Silence (8-part serial, 1982), Pay Any Price (10-part serial, 1983), No Place To Hide (8-part serial, 1984), The Lonely Margins (1988) and Deep Purple (1993).

Personal life
He was married to Grazyna, who died in 1999, and they had a son and three daughters.

Bibliography

Novels
A Choice of Enemies (1972)
Snowball (1974) (featuring Tad Anders)
Palomino Blonde (1975) (featuring Tad Anders) a.k.a. Omega-minus
Where All the Girls Are Sweeter (1975) (writing as Richard Butler) a.k.a. Dangerous Arrivals
The Special Collection (1975) a.k.a. The Networks
The Only Good German (1976) a.k.a. Mission Berlin
Moscow Quadrille (1976) a.k.a. Special Forces
Italian Assets (1976) (writing as Richard Butler) a.k.a. Deadly Departures
The Man with the President's Mind (1977)
The Lantern Network (1978)
The Alpha List (1979)
Consequence of Fear (1979) a.k.a. Smokescreen
The Reaper (1980) a.k.a. The Stalking Angel
The Twentieth Day of January (1980) a.k.a. Cold Tactics
Codeword Cromwell (1981) (writing as Patrick Kelly)
The Lonely Margins (1981) (writing as Patrick Kelly)
The Other Side of Silence (1981)
The Secret Whispers (1981)
Shadow of Shadows (1982)
All Our Tomorrows (1982)
Pay Any Price (1983)
The Judas Factor (1984) featuring Tad Anders
The Girl from Addis (1984)
No Place to Hide (1984) a.k.a. Hostage
Children of Tender Years (1985)
The Choice (1986)
The Seeds of Treason (1986)
The Crossing (1987) a.k.a. Berlin Exchange
A Wilderness of Mirrors (1988)
Deep Purple (1989)
A Time Without Shadows (1990) a.k.a. Rules of the Game
The Dangerous Edge (1991)
Show Me A Hero (1992)
The Line-Crosser (1993)
As Time Goes By (1994)
Beyond the Silence (1995) a.k.a. The Spirit of Liberty
The Long Run (1996)
Aid and Comfort (1997)
Shadow of a Doubt (1998)
The Reckoning (1999)
Never Look Back (2000)
The Assets (2000) a.k.a. Due Process

Short story collection
Other Kinds of Treason (1990)

Radio plays
Long Ago and Far Away (1982)
The Way We Live (1983)
Time Spent in Reconnaissance (1983) – story later included in Other Kinds of Treason
Music of a Small Life (1983)
There's Always Tomorrow (1985) – story later included in Other Kinds of Treason as 'The Dandled Days'

Essays
"Memoirs of an Ex-Spy," in Murder Ink: The Mystery Reader's Companion, edited by Dilys Winn (New York: Workman, 1977), pp. 164–168.
"It's the Real Thing," New Statesman (1 July 1977): 27.

References

External links
WorldCat entries
Allbeury appears on Desert Island Discs in September 1979.

1917 births
2005 deaths
English spy fiction writers
20th-century English novelists
English male novelists
People from Stockport
British Special Operations Executive personnel
20th-century English male writers
People educated at King Edward VI Aston School
English torture victims